Jakub Gierszał (born 20 March 1988) is a Polish actor. His screen debut was in 2009, playing the role of Kazik in the film All that I love (Polish: Wszystko, co kocham). He later starred in the film Suicide Room (Polish: Sala Samobójców), in which he played the character of Dominik, a high school student from a wealthy family who developed a mental health problem.

Gierszał was born in Kraków. His father, Marek, is a theatre director working mainly in Germany. When Jakub was a few months old, his parents moved to Hamburg. After 11 years he returned to Poland and settled in Toruń. He is a student at the Kraków Academy of Dramatic Arts.

In 2012, he was a Polish Film Award nominee for Best Actor for his role in Suicide Room. Gierszał also received a Shooting Stars Award that year. He earned his second Polish Film Award nomination for Best Actor for Breaking the Limits (2017).

Selected filmography
All That I Love (2009) as Kazik
Milion dolarów (2010) as Pawełek Leo
Suicide Room (2011) as Dominik Santorski
Yuma (2012) as Zyga
Lasting (2013) as Michał
Finsterworld (2013) as Maximilian Sandberg
Hiszpanka (2013) as Krystian Ceglarski
Dracula Untold (2014) as Acemi
The Lure (2015)
Morris from America (2016)
Spoor (2017)
Breaking the Limits (2017)
Beyond Words (2017)
Das Boot (2018)
The Getaway King (2021) as Antos

References

External links 

Living people
1988 births
Polish male actors
Male actors from Kraków